Ömer Közen (born 21 August 1981, in Istanbul), is a Turkish footballer.

References

External links

1981 births
Living people
Turkish footballers
Turkey under-21 international footballers
Turkey youth international footballers
Gaziantepspor footballers
Kayseri Erciyesspor footballers
Eskişehirspor footballers
İstanbulspor footballers
Manisaspor footballers
Giresunspor footballers
Sarıyer S.K. footballers

Association football midfielders
}